Ansonia kraensis (Kra stream toad) is a species of toads in the family Bufonidae. It is found on the Kra Isthmus, Thailand. It is morphologically similar to Ansonia malayana from Malaysia, but differs from it in ventral coloration and larval morphology. The exact threats are unknown but are likely forest loss for logging and agricultural expansion.

Description
Ansonia kraensis males measure  and females  in snout–vent length. Tympanum is visible. Dorsum is brown with darker markings, and has small and minute warts, some of them with orange-yellow tips. Limbs have orange-yellow crossbars. Their body is flattened, dorsally black with two transverse light bands, and ventrally unpigmented. Oral disc is large.

Habitat
Ansonia kraensis is a forest species found near streams, sometimes also near seepages some distance away from streams. Tadpoles have been found in a small stream with moderate flow, clinging to the rocks.

References

kraensis
Endemic fauna of Thailand
Amphibians of Thailand
Amphibians described in 2005
Taxa named by Masafumi Matsui